The 1900 Rutgers Queensmen football team represented Rutgers University as an independent during the 1900 college football season. In their first and only season under head coach Michael F. Daly, the Queensmen compiled a 4–4 record and were outscored by their opponents, 66 to 50. The team captain was Oliver D. Mann.

Schedule

References

Rutgers
Rutgers Scarlet Knights football seasons
Rutgers Queensmen football